Scott Edwards may refer to:

 Scott V. Edwards, Harvard University professor of organismal and evolutionary biology
 Scott Edwards (cricketer) (born 1996), Dutch cricketer
 Scott Edwards (footballer) (born 1968), Australian rules footballer
 Scott Edwards (bowls) (born 1973), English indoor bowler

See also
Scott-Edwards House, a historic house in Staten Island, New York